Metaphrynella pollicaris (common name: Malaysian treefrog or Malaysian tree-hole frog) is a species of frog in the family Microhylidae. It is endemic to Peninsular Malaysia.

Description
Males measure  and females  in snout–vent length. Dorsum is dark olive-brown above, with a variable patterning. Tympanum is hidden. Finger tips are expanded into large disks.

Habitat and conservation
The species' natural habitats are evergreen rainforest and forest edges. It lives in hollows in tree trunks and bamboo, where it also reproduces. While it is secretive, the male call is distinctive and makes it surveyable. Based on the calls, it is abundant where it occurs. It abundance seems to be limited by the availability of tree holes. It can occur as low as  asl, but is more common from about  upwards.

It could be locally threatened by habitat loss, although it may benefit from habitat clearing that encourages the growth of giant bamboos, providing it with its microhabitat. It is known from several protected areas.

References

Metaphrynella
Endemic fauna of Malaysia
Amphibians of Malaysia
Taxonomy articles created by Polbot
Amphibians described in 1890